Dr. K or Doctor K may refer to:

Dwight Gooden (born 1964), American baseball player
Alok Kanojia, American psychiatrist
Brendan Kavanagh (born 1967), English pianist and YouTube personality
Susan Kelleher, American veterinarian, star of Dr. K's Exotic Animal ER

See also
DR K, a Danish television station

Lists of people by nickname